is a Japanese professional shogi player, ranked 9-dan. He is currently serving as an executive director of the Japan Shogi Association.

Early life
Keita Inoue was born on January 17, 1964, in Ashiya, Hyōgo. In October 1979, he entered the Japan Shogi Association's apprentice school at the rank of 6-kyū under the sponsorship of shogi professional . He was promoted to 1-dan in 1981, and obtained full professional status and the rank of 4-dan in February 1983.

Shogi professional
Inoue's first tournament victory as a professional came in October 1985 when he defeated Taku Morishita 2 games to 1 to win the 16th  tournament. The following year, he also won the 9th  tournament.

On October 28, 2008, Inoue defeated Kunio Naitō in an Ōi tournament preliminary round game to become the 37th professional to win 600 official games.

On March 28, 2018, Inoue defeated Sōta Fujii in a third round preliminary round game for the 68th Ōshō Tournament. The game was broadcast live by the Igo & Shogi Channel as part of its "Shogi Premium" service. Inoue's victory not only made him the first player aged 50 or older to defeat Fujii in an official game, but also stopped Fujii's 16 game winning streak.

Promotion history
The promotion history  for Inoue is as follows:
 6-kyū: 1979
 1-dan: 1981
 4-dan: February 4, 1983
 5-dan: March 27, 1987
 6-dan: July 12, 1991
 7-dan: April 1, 1996
 8-dan: April 1, 1997
 9-dan: March 3, 2011

Titles and other championships

Awards and honors
Inoue received the Japan Shogi Association Annual Shogi Award for "Best Winning Percentage" in 1993. He also received the association's "Shogi Honor Award" in 2008 in recognition of winning 600 official games as a professional.

JSA director and other offices
Inoue has served on the Japan Shogi Association's board of directors since 2015. From June 2015 until June 2017, he served as a non-executive director. He was re-elected to the board for another two-year term in June 2017, but this time as an executive director. He was re-elected for another two-year term as executive director in June 2019.

References

External links
ShogiHub: Professional Player Info · Inoue, Keita

1964 births
Japanese shogi players
Living people
Professional shogi players
Professional shogi players from Hyōgo Prefecture
Shinjin-Ō